was the penultimate Governor of the South Seas Mandate (1940–1943). He was governor of Fukui Prefecture (1934–1936), Nagano (1936–1938), Ishikawa Prefecture (1938–1939) and Kumamoto Prefecture (1939–1940). He was from Nagasaki Prefecture. He was a graduate of the University of Tokyo.

1890 births
1966 deaths
Governors of Fukui Prefecture
Governors of Nagano
Governors of Ishikawa Prefecture
Governors of Kumamoto Prefecture
Governors of the South Seas Mandate
University of Tokyo alumni
Japanese Police Bureau government officials
Japanese Home Ministry government officials
Politicians from Nagasaki Prefecture
Place of birth missing
Place of death missing